The 2004 Montreal Expos season was the Expos′ 36th and final season in Montreal, Quebec, Canada.  The team finished in fifth and last place in the National League East at 67-95, 29 games behind the first-place  Atlanta Braves. After the season, the team – which had played in Montreal since its foundation as an expansion franchise in 1969 – relocated to Washington, D.C., and became the Washington Nationals, as Major League Baseball returned to Washington for the 2005 season after a 33-season absence.

Offseason
 December 16, 2003: The Expos traded Javier Vázquez  to the New York Yankees for Nick Johnson, Randy Choate, and Juan Rivera.
 January 6, 2004: The Expos signed Tony Batista as a free agent.
 January 8, 2004: The Expos signed Luis Lopez  as a free agent.

Spring training
The Expos held spring training at Space Coast Stadium in Viera, Florida, in 2004. It was their second year of spring training at the facility.

Regular season

Opening Day lineup 
Source

Season standings

National League East

Record vs. opponents

Game log
Source 

|- align="center" bgcolor="ffbbbb"
| 1 || April 6 || @ Marlins || 3–4 || Perisho (1–0) || Ayala (0–1) || Benítez (1) || 55,315 || 0–1
|- align="center" bgcolor="bbffbb"
| 2 || April 7 || @ Marlins || 3–2 || Vargas (1-0) || Penny (0–1) || Biddle (1) ||17,622 || 1–1
|- align="center" bgcolor="ffbbbb"
| 3 || April 8 || @ Marlins || 0–3 || Willis (1–0) || Ohka (0–1) || Benítez (2) || 18,121 || 1–2
|- align="center" bgcolor="ffbbbb"
| 4 || April 9 || vs. Mets@ San Juan, PR || 2–3 (11) || Weathers (1-0) || Ayala (0-2) || Moreno (1) || 14,739 || 1–3
|- align="center" bgcolor="bbffbb"
| 5 ||  April 10 || vs. Mets@ San Juan, PR  || 1-0  || Patterson (1-0) || Seo (0-1) || Biddle (2) || 11,957 || 2–3
|- align="center" bgcolor="ffbbbb"
| 6 ||  April 11 || vs. Mets@ San Juan, PR  || 1–4 || Glavine (1-0) || Hernández (0-1) || Looper (2) || 10,623 || 2–4
|- align="center" bgcolor="ffbbbb"
| 7 ||  April 13 || vs. Marlins@ San Juan, PR || 0–5 || Penny (1-1) || Vargas (1-1) || || 14,620|| 2–5
|- align="center" bgcolor="ffbbbb"
| 8 ||  April 14 || vs. Marlins@ San Juan, PR || 0–9 || Willis (2-0) || Ohka (0-2) || || 13,180|| 2–6 
|- align="center" bgcolor="ffbbbb"
| 9 ||  April 15|| vs. Marlins@ San Juan, PR || 0–3  || Pavano (1-0)  || Day (0-1) || Benítez (6) || 8,494 || 2–7
|- align="center" bgcolor="ffbbbb"
| 10 || April 16 || @ Phillies || 2–4 || Milton (1-0)  || Hernández (0-2) || Wagner (3) || 39,613 || 2–8
|- align="center" bgcolor="ffbbbb"
| 11 || April 17 || @ Phillies || 3–6 || Millwood (1-2)  || Patterson (1-1) || Wagner (4) || 42,931 || 2–9
|- align="center" bgcolor="ffbbbb"
| 12 || April 18 || @ Phillies || 4–5 || Wagner (1-0)  || Biddle (0-1) || || 43,791 || 2–10
|- align="center" bgcolor="ffbbbb"
| 13 || April 19 || @ Mets || 1–4 || Yates (1-1) || Ohka (0-3) || Looper (3) || 14,002 || 2–11
|- align="center" bgcolor="bbffbb"
| 14 || April 20 || @ Mets || 2–1 || Day (1-1) || Weathers (1-1) || Biddle (3) || 14,513 || 3–11
|- align="center" bgcolor="bbffbb"
| 15 || April 21 ||  @ Mets || 2–1 || Hernández (1-2)  || Glavine (2-1) || Biddle (4) || 23,565 || 4–11
|- align="center" bgcolor="ffbbbb"
| 16 || April 22 || @ Mets || 2–3 || Trachsel (2-2) || Bentz (0–1) || Looper (4) || 15,062 || 4–12
|- align="center" bgcolor="ffbbbb"
| 17 || April 23 || Phillies || 6–8 || Millwood (2-2) || Bentz (0-2) || Wagner (5) || 30,112 || 4–13
|- align="center" bgcolor="ffbbbb"
| 18 || April 24 || Phillies || 0–7 || Wolf (1-1) || Ohka (0-4) || || 6,899 || 4–14
|- align="center" bgcolor="bbffbb"
| 19 || April 25 || Phillies || 2–0 || Day (2-1) || Padilla (0-3) || Biddle (5) || 8,267 || 5–14
|- align="center" bgcolor="ffbbbb"
| 20 || April 26 || @ Padres || 2–3 || Otsuka (1-1) || Ayala (1-1) || || 25,438|| 5–15
|- align="center" bgcolor="ffbbbb"
| 21 || April 27 || @ Padres || 0–3 || Valdez (3-0)  || Patterson (1-2) || Hoffman (4) || 25,473 || 5–16 
|- align="center" bgcolor="ffbbbb"
| 22 || April 28 ||  @ Padres || 4–5 || Osuna (1-0) || Ayala (0-4) || Hoffman (5) || 24,079 || 5–17
|- align="center" bgcolor="ffbbbb"
| 23 || April 29 || @ Padres || 1–2 || Wells (1–2) || Ohka (0–5) || Hoffman (6)  || 21,689 || 5–18
|- align="center" bgcolor="ffbbbb"
| 24 || April 30 || @ Dodgers || 4–13 || Ishii (4–1) || Day (2–2) || || 54,958 || 5–19
|-

|- align="center" bgcolor="ffbbbb"
| 25 || May 1 || @ Dodgers || 4–5 || Mota (1–0)  || Ayala (0–5) || Gagné (7) || 52,900 || 5–20
|- align="center" bgcolor="bbffbb"
| 26 || May 2 || @ Dodgers || 6–4  || Kim (1–0)  || Nomo (3–3) || || 35,351 || 6–20
|- align="center" bgcolor="bbffbb"
| 27 || May 4 || Rockies || 10–4 || Vargas (2–1)  || Jennings (1–4) || || 4,001 || 7–20
|- align="center" bgcolor="ffbbbb"
| 28 || May 5 || Rockies || 0–2 || Kennedy (4-0) || Day (2-3) || Chacón (7) || 3,609 || 7–21
|- align="center" bgcolor="bbffbb"
| 29 || May 6 || Rockies || 3–1 || Hernández (2–2) || Elarton (0–5) || || 8,851 || 8–21
|- align="center" bgcolor="bbffbb"
| 30 || May 7 || Cardinals || 5–2 || Kim (2–0) || Morris (3–3) || Biddle (6) || 5,332 || 9–21
|- align="center" bgcolor="bbffbb"
| 31 || May 8 || Cardinals || 2–0 || Ohka (1–5) || Marquis (1–3) || Biddle (7) || 5,611 || 10–21
|- align="center" bgcolor="ffbbbb"
| 32 || May 9 || Cardinals || 2–5 || Carpenter (3–1) || Vargas (2–2) || Isringhausen (5) || 12,301 || 10–22
|- align="center" bgcolor="ffbbbb"
| 33 || May 11 || @ Brewers || 5-8 (14) || Burba (3-0) || Tucker (0-1) || || 10,761 || 10-23
|- align="center" bgcolor="ffbbbb"
| 34 || May 12 || @ Brewers || 3-4 || Obermueller (2-1) || Day (2-4) || Kolb (7) || 10,803 || 10-24
|- align="center" bgcolor="ffbbbb"
| 35 || May 13 || @ Brewers || 4-7 || Davis (3-2) || Kim (2-18) || Kolb (8) || 14,972 || 10-25
|- align="center" bgcolor="bbffbb" 
| 36 || May 14 || @ Diamondbacks || 4-3 || Cordero (1-0) || Valverde (0-1) || Biddle (8) || 27,188 || 11-25
|- align="center" bgcolor="bbffbb"
| 37 || May 15 || @ Diamondbacks || 5-0 || Vargas (3-2) || Daigle (2-2) || || 32,379 || 12-25
|- align="center" bgcolor="bbffbb" 
| 38 || May 16 || @ Diamondbacks || 6-1 || Hernández (3-2) || Sparks (2-3) || || 32,629 || 13-25
|- align="center" bgcolor="bbffbb"
| 39 || May 18 || vs. Brewers@ San Juan, PR || 3-2 || Day (3-4) || Davis (3-3) || Biddle (9) || 8,387 || 14-25
|- align="center" bgcolor="ffbbbb"
| 40 || May 19 ||  vs. Brewers@ San Juan, PR || 3-6 || Santos (2-0) || Kim (2-2) || Kolb (9) || 8,157|| 14-26
|- align="center" bgcolor="ffbbbb"
| 41 || May 20 || vs. Brewers @ San Juan, PR || 2-3 || Adams (2-0) || Biddle (0-1) || Kolb (10) || 8,941 || 14-27
|- align="center" bgcolor="ffbbbb"
| 42 || May 21 || vs. Giants@ San Juan, PR || 5-6 || Franklin (1-0) || Hernández (3-3) || Herges (12) || 14,325 || 14-28
|- align="center" bgcolor="ffbbbb"
| 43 || May 22 || vs. Giants@ San Juan, PR || 2-7 (11) || Walker (3-0) || Fikac (0-1) || || 16,836 || 14-29
|- align="center" bgcolor="bbbbbb"
| – || May 23 || vs. Giants@ San Juan, PR || colspan=6| Postponed (rain) Rescheduled for August 18 as part of a doubleheader at San Francisco
|- align="center" bgcolor="ffbbbb"
| 44 || May 24 || Braves || 0-5 || Thomson (3-2) || Day (3-5) || || 4,675 || 14-30
|- align="center" bgcolor="bbffbb"
| 45 || May 25 || Braves || 3-1 || Ohka (2–5) || Ramírez (2-4) || Biddle (10) || 4,235 || 15-30
|- align="center" bgcolor="ffbbbb"
| 46 || May 26 || Braves || 1-6 || Ortiz (5-4) || Hernández (3-4) || || 4,544 || 15-31
|- align="center" bgcolor="ffbbbb"
| 47 || May 28 || Reds || 6–7 || Lidle (4–4) || Vargas (3-3) || Graves (22) || 7,058 || 15–32
|- align="center" bgcolor="ffbbbb"
| 48 || May 29 || Reds || 1–4 || Acevedo (3–3) || Day (3-6) || Graves (23) || 7,913 || 15–33
|- align="center" bgcolor="bbffbb"
| 49 || May 30 || Reds || 6–2 || Ohka (3–5) || Valentine (0–1) || Cordero (1) || 9,745 || 16–33
|- align="center" bgcolor="ffbbbb"
| 50 || May 31 || @ Braves || 2–8 || Ortiz (6–4) || Hernández (3–5) || || 24,945 || 16–34
|-

|- align="center" bgcolor="ffbbbb"
| 51 || June 1 ||  @ Braves || 6–7 || Almanza (1–1) ||  Biddle (0–3) || || 20,271 || 16–35 
|- align="center" bgcolor="bbffbb"
| 52 || June 2 ||  @ Braves || 8–4 || Vargas (4–3) || Hampton (1–6) ||  || 21,055 || 17–35 
|- align="center" bgcolor="bbffbb"
| 53 || June 4 || @ Reds || 4–2 || Day (4–6) || Acevedo (3–4) ||  Biddle (11) || 32,701 || 18–35
|- align="center" bgcolor="ffbbbb"
| 54 || June 5 ||  @ Reds || 3–6 (10) || Jones (4–1) || Cordero (1–1) || || 40,545 || 18–36
|- align="center" bgcolor="ffbbbb"
| 55 || June 6 || @ Reds || 5–6 || Matthews (1–0) ||  Biddle (0–4) || || 31,814 || 18–37
|- align="center" bgcolor="ffbbbb"
| 56 || June 8 || @ Royals || 2–4 || Greinke (1–1) || Armas (0–1) || Affeldt (7) || 15,209 || 18–38
|- align="center" bgcolor="bbbbbb"
| – || June 9 || @ Royals || colspan=6| Postponed (rain) Rescheduled for June 10 as part of a doubleheader
|- align="center" bgcolor="bbffbb"
| 57 || June 10 (1) || @ Royals || 8–0  || Day (5–6) || Reyes (2–1) || ||  || 19–38  
|- align="center" bgcolor="bbffbb"
| 58 || June 10 (2) || @ Royals || 7–2 || Kim (3–2) || Gobble (3–4) ||  || 16,891|| 20–38
|- align="center" bgcolor="ffbbbb"
| 59 || June 11 || @ Mariners || 0–1 || Guardado (2–0) || Hernández (3–6) || || 32,826 || 20–39
|- align="center" bgcolor="ffbbbb"
| 60 || June 12 || @ Mariners || 0–3 || Moyer (5–2) || Vargas (4–4) || Guardado (11) || 36,562 || 20–40
|- align="center" bgcolor="ffbbbb"
| 61 || June 13 || @ Mariners || 1–8 || Piñeiro (2–8) || Armas (0–2) || || 43,339 || 20–41
|- align="center" bgcolor="ffbbbb"
| 62 || June 15 || Twins || 2–8 || Santana (5–5) || Day (5–7) || || 4,557 || 20–42
|- align="center" bgcolor="ffbbbb"
| 63 || June 16 || Twins || 4–5 (11) || Rincón (8–3) || Fikac (0–3) || Nathan (17) || 3,763 || 20–43
|- align="center" bgcolor="ffbbbb"
| 64 || June 17 || Twins || 4–6 || Fultz (3–2) || Hernández (3–7) || Nathan (18) || 10,044 || 20–44
|- align="center" bgcolor="ffbbbb"
| 65 || June 18 || White Sox || 7–11 || Cotts (1–3) || Ayala (0–6) || Marte (3) || 4,576 || 20–45
|- align="center" bgcolor="bbffbb"
| 66 || June 19 || White Sox || 17–14 || Fikac (1–2) || Muñoz (0–1) || Cordero (2) || 18,414 || 21–45
|- align="center" bgcolor="bbffbb"
| 67 || June 20 || White Sox || 4–2 || Cordero (2–1) || Garland (5–4) || || 6,546 || 22–45
|- align="center" bgcolor="bbffbb"
| 68 || June 22 || Phillies || 5–2 || Hernández (4–7) || Myers (5–4) || Cordero (3) || 4,564 || 23–45
|- align="center" bgcolor="ffbbbb"
| 69 || June 23 ||  Phillies || 2–5 || Millwood (5–5) || Kim (3–3) || Wagner (11) || 4,209 || 23–46
|- align="center" bgcolor="bbffbb"
| 70 || June 24 ||  Phillies || 3–2 || Armas (1–2) || Milton (9–2) || Cordero (4)|| 11,655 || 24–46
|- align="center" bgcolor="ffbbbb"
| 71 || June 25 || @ Blue Jays || 1–3 || Towers (2–2) || Day (5–8) || Frasor (7) || 16,484 || 24–47
|- align="center" bgcolor="ffbbbb"
| 72 || June 26 || @ Blue Jays || 5–10 || Bastita (6–5) || Downs (0–1) || || 23,875|| 24–48
|- align="center" bgcolor="bbffbb"
| 73 || June 27 || @ Blue Jays || 9–4 || Hernández (5–7) || Hentgen (2–8) || || 25,915 || 25–48
|- align="center" bgcolor="ffbbbb"
| 74 || June 28 || @ Phillies || 6–14 || Millwood (6–5) || Kim (3–4) || || 39,444|| 25–49
|- align="center" bgcolor="ffbbbb"
| 75 || June 29 || @ Phillies || 7–17 || Milton (10–2) || Hill (0–1) || || 35,390 || 25–50
|- align="center" bgcolor="bbffbb"
| 76 || June 30 || @ Phillies || 6–3 || Horgan (1–0) || Worrell (2–3) || Cordero (5) || 40,407 || 26–50
|-

|- align="center" bgcolor="ffbbbb"
| 77 || July 1 || @ Phillies || 5–10 || Wolf (3–3) || Downs (0–2) || || 43,246 || 26–51
|- align="center" bgcolor="bbffbb"
| 78 || July 2 || vs. Blue Jays@ San Juan, PR || 2–0  || Hernández (6–7) || Bush (0–1) || || 8,220 || 27-51
|- align="center" bgcolor="ffbbbb"
| 79 || July 3 || vs. Blue Jays@ San Juan, PR || 0–2 || Halladay (7–5) || Armas (1–3) || Frasor (8) || 8,831 || 27-52
|- align="center" bgcolor="bbffbb"
| 80 || July 4 || vs. Blue Jays@ San Juan, PR || 6–4 || Hill (1–1) || Lilly (7–5) || Horgan (1) || 8,279 || 28-52
|- align="center" bgcolor="ffbbbb"
| 81 || July 5 || vs. Braves@ San Juan, PR || 4–11 || Byrd (2–1) || Day (5–9) || || 13,122 || 28-53
|- align="center" bgcolor="ffbbbb"
| 82 || July 6 || vs. Braves@ San Juan, PR || 0–1 || Ortiz (9–6) || Downs (0–3) || Smoltz (15) || 7,697 || 28-54
|- align="center" bgcolor="ffbbbb"
| 83 || July 7 || vs. Braves@ San Juan, PR || 2–14 || Wright (6–5) || Hernández (6–8) || || 8,534 || 28-55
|- align="center" bgcolor="bbffbb"
| 84 || July 8 || vs. Pirates@ San Juan, PR || 2–1 || Ayala (1–6) || Grabow (0–3) || Cordero (6) || 7,746 || 29-55
|- align="center" bgcolor="ffbbbb"
| 85 || July 9 || vs. Pirates@ San Juan, PR || 0–11 || Burnett (3–2) || Hill (1–2) || || 7,436 || 29-56
|- align="center" bgcolor="bbffbb"
| 86 || July 10 || vs. Pirates@ San Juan, PR || 4–0 || Biddle (1–4) || Wells (4–6) || || 8,780 || 30-56
|- align="center" bgcolor="bbffbb"
| 87 || July 11 || vs. Pirates@ San Juan, PR || 2–1 || Downs (1–3) || Fogg (6–7) || Cordero (7) || 8,101 || 31-56
|- style="text-align:center; background:#bbb;"
|colspan=9| All–Star Break (July 12–14)
|- align="center" bgcolor="ffbbbb"
| 88 || July 15 || @ Braves || 0–8 || Wright (7–5) || Hernández (6–9) || || 33,883 || 31-57
|- align="center" bgcolor="bbffbb"
| 89 || July 16 ||  @ Braves || 5–1 || Horgan (2–0) || Byrd (2–2) || || 26,424 || 32-57
|- align="center" bgcolor="ffbbbb"
| 90 || July 17 || @ Braves || 2–6 || Ortiz (11–6) || Bentz (0–3) || Smoltz (17) || 34,296 || 32-58
|- align="center" bgcolor="ffbbbb"
| 91 || July 18 || @ Braves || 5–16 || Thompson (7–7) || Downs (1–4) || || 23,952 || 32-59
|- align="center" bgcolor="bbffbb"
| 92 || July 19 || @ Pirates || 6–2 || Horgan (3–0) || Grabow (0–4) || || 14,787 || 33-59
|- align="center" bgcolor="ffbbbb"
| 93 || July 20 || @ Pirates || 1–2 || Burnett (4–2) || Hernández (6–10) || Mesa (26) || 18,075 || 33-60
|- align="center" bgcolor="ffbbbb"
| 94 || July 21 || @ Mets || 4–5 || Moreno (3–1) || Horgan (3–1) || Looper (20) || 30,227 || 33-61
|- align="center" bgcolor="bbffbb"
| 95 || July 22 ||  @ Mets || 4–1 || Ayala (2–6) || Franco (2–7) || Cordero (8) || 27,637 || 34-61
|- align="center" bgcolor="bbffbb"
| 96 || July 23 || Marlins || 2–1 || Armas (2–3) || Penny (8–8) || Cordero (9) || 6,407 || 35-61
|- align="center" bgcolor="bbffbb"
| 97 || July 24 || Marlins || 6–2 || Biddle (2–4) || Willis (7–6) || || 7,229 || 36-61
|- align="center" bgcolor="bbffbb"
| 98 || July 25 || Marlins || 6–4 || Hernández (7–10) || Wayne (3–3) || Ayala (1) || 9,688 || 37-61
|- align="center" bgcolor="bbffbb"
| 99 || July 26 || Mets || 19–10 || Ayala (3–6) || Erickson (0–1) || || 6,643 || 38-61
|- align="center" bgcolor="ffbbbb"
| 100 || July 27 || Mets || 2–4 || Glavine (8–8) || Day (5–10) || Looper (21) || 7,147 || 38-62
|- align="center" bgcolor="bbffbb"
| 101 || July 28 || Mets || 7–4 || Tucker (1–1) || Seo (4–7) || Cordero (10) || 6,852 || 39-62
|- align="center" bgcolor="ffbbbb"
| 102 || July 29 || Mets || 1–10 || Leiter (7–3) || Biddle (2–5) || || 20,042 || 39-63
|- align="center" bgcolor="bbffbb"
| 103 || July 30 || @ Marlins || 9–0 || Hernández (8–10) || Beckett (4–6) || || 16,441 || 40-63
|- align="center" bgcolor="bbffbb"
| 104 || July 31 || @ Marlins || 8–5 || Biddle (3–5) || Manzanillo (3–3) || Cordero (11) || 21,562 || 41-63
|-

|- align="center" bgcolor="bbbbbb"
| – || August 1 || @ Marlins || colspan=6| Postponed (rain) Rescheduled for September 14 as part of a doubleheader
|- align="center" bgcolor="bbffbb"
| 105 || August 3 || @ Cardinals || 10–6 (12) || Cordero (3–1) || Haren (0–2) || || 33,696 || 42-63
|- align="center" bgcolor="ffbbbb"
| 106 || August 4 || @ Cardinals || 4–5 || Tavárez (3–3) || Cordero (3–2) || || 35,779 || 42-64
|- align="center" bgcolor="ffbbbb"
| 107 || August 5 || @ Cardinals || 1–2 || Carpenter (12–4) || Ayala (3–7) || Isringhausen (28) || 31,961 || 42-65
|- align="center" bgcolor="ffbbbb"
| 108 || August 6 || @ Astros || 0–4 || Oswalt (12–8) || Biddle (3–6) || || 35,921 || 42-66
|- align="center" bgcolor="bbffbb"
| 109 || August 7 || @ Astros || 8–3 || Rauch (2–1) || Weathers (6–6) || || 39,840 || 43-66
|- align="center" bgcolor="bbffbb"
| 110 || August 8 || @ Astros || 5–2 || Tucker (2–1) || Clemens (12–4) || || 38,407 || 44-66
|- align="center" bgcolor="bbffbb"
| 111 || August 10 || Diamondbacks || 4–0 || Hernández (9–10) || Johnson (11–10) || || 8,386 || 45-66
|- align="center" bgcolor="bbffbb"
| 112 || August 11 || Diamondbacks || 7–3 || Patterson (2–2) || Webb (4–14) || || 5,089 || 46-66
|- align="center" bgcolor="bbffbb"
| 113 || August 12 || Diamondbacks || 7–5 || Ayala (4–7) || Cormier (1–4) || Cordero (12) || 14,639 || 47-66
|- align="center" bgcolor="bbffbb"
| 114 || August 13 || Astros || 6–5 (12) || Vargas (5–4) || Harville (0–2) || || 8,593 || 48-66
|- align="center" bgcolor="bbffbb"
| 115 || August 14 || Astros || 8–3 || Tucker (3–1) || Hernández (0–1) || || 11,929 || 49-66
|- align="center" bgcolor="ffbbbb"
| 116 || August 15 || Astros || 4–5 || Miceli (5–6) || Ayala (4–8) || Lidge (13) || 13,528 || 49-67
|- align="center" bgcolor="ffbbbb"
| 117 || August 16 || @ Giants || 5–8 || Christiansen (3–2) || Cordero (3–3) || Hermanson (4) || 39,545 || 49-68
|- align="center" bgcolor="ffbbbb"
| 118 || August 17 || @ Giants || 4–5 || Hermanson (5–5) || Ayala (4–9) || || 39,511 || 49-69
|- align="center" bgcolor="bbffbb"
| 119 || August 18 (1) || @ Giants || 6–2 || Biddle (4–6) || Hennessey (1–2) || ||  || 50-69
|- align="center" bgcolor="ffbbbb"
| 120 || August 18 (2) || @ Giants || 4–14 || Franklin (2–0) || Tucker (3–2) || || 42,296 || 50-70
|- align="center" bgcolor="bbffbb"
| 121 || August 20 || @ Rockies || 4–3 || Ayala (5–9) || Fuentes (1–3) || Cordero (13) || 32,707 || 51-70
|- align="center" bgcolor="ffbbbb"
| 122 || August 21 || @ Rockies || 2–5 || Kennedy (6–5) || Hernández (9–11) || || 33,225 || 51-71
|- align="center" bgcolor="bbffbb"
| 123 || August 22 || @ Rockies || 8–2 || Patterson (3–2) || Jennings (11–11) || || 26,833 || 52-71
|- align="center" bgcolor="bbffbb"
| 124 || August 23 || Dodgers || 8–7 || Cordero (4–3) || Carrara (3–1) || || 8,639 || 53-71
|- align="center" bgcolor="ffbbbb"
| 125 || August 24 || Dodgers || 2–10 || Ishii (12–6) || Biddle (4–7) || || 8,109 || 53-72
|- align="center" bgcolor="bbffbb"
| 126 || August 25 || Dodgers || 6–3 || Horgan (4–1) || Lima (11–4) || Ayala (2) || 7,570 || 54-72
|- align="center" bgcolor="ffbbbb"
| 127 || August 26 || Dodgers || 3–10 || Weaver (12–10) || Hernández (9–12) || || 18,520 || 54-73
|- align="center" bgcolor="bbffbb"
| 128 || August 27 || Padres || 10–3 || Downs (2–4) || Tankersley (0–4) || || 8,165 || 55-73
|- align="center" bgcolor="ffbbbb"
| 129 || August 28 || Padres || 2–5 || Peavy (11–3) || Patterson (3–3) || Hoffman (33) || 15,450 || 55-74
|- align="center" bgcolor="ffbbbb"
| 130 || August 29 || Padres || 3–11 || Wells (9–7) || Kim (3–5) || || 12,181 || 55-75
|- align="center" bgcolor="ffbbbb"
| 131 || August 30 || Cubs || 2–5 || Maddux (13–8) || Biddle (4–8) || Hawkins (20) || 8,122 || 55-76
|- align="center" bgcolor="bbffbb"
| 132 || August 31 || Cubs || 8–0 || Hernández (10–12) || Prior (4–4) || || 7,162 || 56-76
|- align="center" bgcolor="

|- align="center" bgcolor="ffbbbb"
| 133 || September 1 || Cubs || 1–2 (11) || Hawkins (4–4) || Vargas (5–5) || || 5,837 || 56-77
|- align="center" bgcolor="ffbbbb"
| 134 || September 3 || Braves || 1–7 || Byrd (6–4) || Downs (2–5) || || 8,617 || 56-78
|- align="center" bgcolor="ffbbbb"
| 135 || September 4 || Braves || 0–9 || Ortiz (14–7) || Patterson (3–4) || || 9,772 || 56-79
|- align="center" bgcolor="bbffbb"
| 136 || September 5 || Braves || 4–3 (12) || Tucker (4–2) || Cruz (4–2) || || 10,015 || 57-79
|- align="center" bgcolor="ffbbbb"
| 137 || September 6 || @ Cubs || 1–9 || Zambrano (13–8) || Armas (2–4) || || 38,807 || 57-80
|- align="center" bgcolor="bbffbb"
| 138 || September 7 || @ Cubs || 7–6 (12) || Cordero (5–3) || Wellemeyer (1–1) || Horgan (2) || 38,321 || 58-80
|- align="center" bgcolor="bbffbb"
| 139 || September 8 || @ Cubs || 6–0 || Downs (3–5) || Maddux (13–9) || || 38,379 || 59-80
|- align="center" bgcolor="ffbbbb"
| 140 ||  || @ Braves || 3–4 || Thomson (11–8) || Patterson (3–5) || Smoltz (37) || 22,086 || 59-81
|- align="center" bgcolor="ffbbbb"
| 141 ||  || @ Braves || 1–8 || Cruz (5–2) || Hernández (10–13) || || 28,860 || 59-82
|- align="center" bgcolor="ffbbbb"
| 142 ||  || @ Braves || 8–9 (12) || Cruz (6–2) || Ayala (5–10) || || 25,865 || 59-83
|- align="center" bgcolor="ffbbbb"
| 143 ||  || vs. Marlins@ Chicago || 3–6 || Perisho (5–2) || Majewski (0–1) || || 4,003 || 59-84
|- align="center" bgcolor="ffbbbb"
| 144 ||  || vs. Marlins@ Chicago || 6–8 || Seánez (5–2) || Ayala (5–11) || Mota (4) || 5,457 || 59-85
|- align="center" bgcolor="bbbbbb"
| – ||  || @ Marlins || colspan=6| Postponed (Hurricane Ivan) Rescheduled for September 15 as part of a doubleheader  
|- align="center" bgcolor="bbffbb"
| 145 ||  || @ Marlins || 6–2 ||  Patterson (4–5) || Pavano (17–6) || ||  || 60-85
|- align="center" bgcolor="bbffbb"
| 146 ||  || @ Marlins || 10–4 || Rauch (3–1) || Bump (2–4) || || 12,608 || 61-85
|- align="center" bgcolor="ffbbbb"
| 147 ||  || @ Marlins || 3–4 || Willis (10–9) || Hernández (10–14) || Benítez (42) || 17,219 || 61-86
|- align="center" bgcolor="bbffbb"
| 148 ||  || @ Phillies || 12–8 || Ayala (6–11) || Worrell (4–6) || || 35,498 || 63-86
|- align="center" bgcolor="bbffbb"
| 149 ||  || @ Phillies || 6–5 (14) || Cordero (6–3) || Myers (9–10) || Beltran (1) || 38,650 || 63-86
|- align="center" bgcolor="ffbbbb"
| 150 ||  || @ Phillies || 2–7 || Floyd (2–0) || Downs (3–6) || || 42,603 || 63-87
|- align="center" bgcolor="bbffbb"
| 151 ||  || Mets || 6–1 || Hernández (11–14) || Leiter (9–8) || || 3,839 || 64-87
|- align="center" bgcolor="ffbbbb"
| 152 ||  || Mets || 2–3 || Fortunato (1–0) || Ayala (6–12) || Looper (26) || 3,664 || 64-88
|- align="center" bgcolor="ffbbbb"
| 153 ||  || Mets || 2–4 || Glavine (10–13) || Ohka (3–6) || Looper (27) || 11,142 || 64-89
|- align="center" bgcolor="bbffbb"
| 154 ||  || Phillies || 8–1 || Kim (4–5) || Myers (9–11) || || 5,481 || 65-89
|- align="center" bgcolor="ffbbbb"
| 155 ||  || Phillies || 3–4 (10) || Worrell (5–6) || Eischen (0–1) || Wagner (19) || 8,491 || 65-90
|- align="center" bgcolor="ffbbbb"
| 156 ||  || Phillies || 1–2 || Lidle (11–12) || Hernández (11–15) || Wagner (20) || 12,382 || 65-91
|- align="center" bgcolor="ffbbbb"
| 157 ||  || Marlins || 1–4 || Beckett (8–9) || Patterson (4–6) || Benítez (45) || 3,923 || 65-92
|- align="center" bgcolor="ffbbbb"
| 158 ||  || Marlins || 2–5 || Valdez (14–8) || Ohka (3–7) || Benítez (46) || 5,416 || 65-93
|- align="center" bgcolor="ffbbbb"
| 159 ||  || Marlins || 1–9 || Pavano (18–8) || Kim (4–6) || || 31,395 || 65-94
|-

|- align="center" bgcolor="bbffbb"
| 160 || October 1 || @ Mets || 4–2 || Rauch (4–1) || Feliciano (1–1) || Cordero (14)  || 29,273 || 66-94
|- align="center" bgcolor="bbffbb"
| 161 || October 2 || @ Mets || 6–3 || Cordero (7–3) || Looper (2–5) || Majewski (1) || 30,147 || 67-94
|- align="center" bgcolor="ffbbbb"
| 162 || October 3 || @ Mets || 1–8 || Glavine (11–14) || Patterson (4–7) || || 33,569 || 67-95
|-

Notable transactions
 June 11, 2004: The Expos released Luis Lopez.
 July 31, 2004: The Expos sent Orlando Cabrera to the Boston Red Sox as part of a four-team deal. The Chicago Cubs sent Brendan Harris, Alex Gonzalez, and Francis Beltrán to the Expos. The Red Sox sent Nomar Garciaparra and Matt Murton to the Cubs. The Minnesota Twins sent Doug Mientkiewicz to the Red Sox. The Cubs sent minor-league player Justin Jones to the Twins.
 September 16, 2004: The Expos sent Alex Gonzalez to the San Diego Padres as part of a conditional deal.

Roster

Final days
September 29, 2004: Hours after the announcement of the impending move to Washington, D.C., the Expos played their final game in Montreal, a 9–1 loss to the Florida Marlins before 31,395 fans at Olympic Stadium. On that day the MLB officially recognized the 1994 Expos as "The Best Team in Baseball" with a banner for the center field wall, (ironically that banner only lasted one game as it was the last Expos game in Montreal). The game was almost forfeited in the 8th inning when Expos fans threw golf balls onto the field in hopes of making the game longer.
October 2, 2004: The Expos earned their last win before becoming the Nationals, defeating the New York Mets 6–3. Brad Wilkerson hit the last home run in Expos history in the ninth inning, his 32nd of the year.
October 3, 2004: The New York Mets defeated Montreal 8–1 at Shea Stadium, in the final game as the Montreal Expos.  Jamey Carroll scored the last Expos run and Endy Chávez became the final Expo batter in history when he grounded out in the top of the ninth to end the game.  Coincidentally, Shea Stadium was where the Expos had played their first-ever game, in 1969.

The final game in Montreal

Scorecard
September 29, Olympic Stadium, Montréal, Québec

Batting

Pitching

The final game as the Expos

Scorecard
October 3, Shea Stadium, Flushing, New York

Batting

Pitching

Attendance

Including both games played in Montreal and "home" games played in San Juan, the Expos drew 749,550 fans during the 2004 season, and were 16th in attendance among the 16 National League teams. Their highest attendance for the season was for their final game in Montreal on September 29, which attracted 31,395 fans to see them play the Florida Marlins, while their lowest was for a game in Montreal on May 5 against the Colorado Rockies, which drew only 3,609 fans. For games played in San Juan, the largest crowd was 16,836 for a game against the San Francisco Giants on May 22, and the smallest was a crowd of 7,436 that came to a game against the Pittsburgh Pirates on July 9.

The Expos lost one home date during the season, when the May 23 "home" game at San Juan against the Giants was rained out and rescheduled to be played as an away game in San Francisco as part of a single-admission doubleheader on August 18. The doubleheader drew 42,296.

Player stats

Batting 
Note: Pos = Position; G = Games played; AB = At bats; R = Runs scored; H = Hits; 2B = Doubles; 3B = Triples; HR = Home runs; RBI = Runs batted in; AVG = Batting average; SB = Stolen bases

Complete offensive statistics are available here.

Pitching
Note: Pos = Position; W = Wins; L = Losses; ERA = Earned run average; G = Games pitched; GS = Games started; SV = Saves; IP = Innings pitched; R = Runs allowed; ER = Earned runs allowed; BB = Walks allowed; K = Strikeouts

Complete pitching statistics are available here.

Awards and honors 
 Liván Hernández, Silver Slugger Award

League leaders 
 Liván Hernández, National League Leader, Complete Games, 9
 Liván Hernández, National League Leader, Innings Pitched, 255.0
 Liván Hernández, National League Leader, 3,927 pitches thrown

All-Stars 
2004 Major League Baseball All-Star Game
 Liván Hernández, pitcher, reserve

Relocation to Washington
After several years in a holding pattern, MLB began actively looking for a relocation site for the Expos. Some of the choices included Orlando, Florida; Dayton, Ohio; Oklahoma City; Washington, D.C.; San Juan, Puerto Rico; Monterrey, Mexico; Portland, Oregon; Northern Virginia; Norfolk, Virginia; and Charlotte, North Carolina. In the decision-making process, Commissioner Bud Selig added Las Vegas, Nevada to the list of potential Expos homes.

On September 29, 2004, MLB officially announced that the Expos would move to Washington, D.C. in 2005. The move was approved by the owners of the other teams in a 28–1 vote on December 3 (Baltimore Orioles owner Peter Angelos cast the sole dissenting vote). In addition, on November 15, 2004, a lawsuit by the former team owners against MLB and former majority owner Jeffrey Loria was struck down by arbitrators, ending legal moves to keep the Expos in Montreal.

Retired numbers ceremony
As a tribute to the Expos, on October 18, 2005, the Montreal Canadiens honoured the departed team by raising an Expos commemorative banner, which lists the retired numbers, to the rafters of the Bell Centre. Gary Carter and Andre Dawson were at the ceremony with Youppi, who was now the Canadiens mascot. The Banner featured all of the Expos retired numbers:

  8 Gary Carter, C, 1974-84 & 1992
 10 Andre Dawson, OF, 1977–86 and Rusty Staub, OF, 1969-71 & 1979
 30 Tim Raines, OF, 1979-90 & 2001
 42 Jackie Robinson (retired throughout baseball; played with the Montreal Royals in 1946)

Expos in the Washington Nationals Ring of Honor

On August 10, 2010, the Washington Nationals formally presented a new "Ring of Honor" at Nationals Park in Washington, D.C., to honor Major League Baseball Hall of Fame players with ties to the Washington Nationals, original Washington Senators, expansion Washington Senators, Homestead Grays, or Montreal Expos. Gary Carter and Andre Dawson were the former Expos honored in the Ring of Honor on that day. The Expos logo appears next to their names in the Ring of Honor. On May 9, 2015, the Nationals added former Expos (2002–2004) and Nationals (2005–2006) manager Frank Robinson to the Ring of Honor at Nationals Park.

Farm system

Notes

References 
 2004 Montreal Expos team page at Baseball Reference
 2004 Montreal Expos team page at www.baseball-almanac.com

External links
Montreal
Expos at Sports Encyclopedia
Expos at CBC Archives
Ken Hill at last Expos game
Montreal Expos myths

Washington
The Nationals Report
Official site of the Washington Nationals 
Official Washington Nationals Fan Forum 
Washington Nationals Roster
FOX Sports - Washington Nationals Team Front
Expos New Name: Nationals (TSN)

Montreal Expos seasons
Montreal Expos season
2000s in Montreal
2004 in Quebec